U.S. Route 54 (US 54) is an east–west United States Highway that runs northeast–southwest for  from El Paso, Texas, to Griggsville, Illinois. The Union Pacific Railroad's Tucumcari Line (former Southern Pacific and Rock Island Lines "Golden State Route") runs parallel to US 54 from El Paso to Pratt, Kansas, which comprises about two-thirds of the route.

The highway's western (and southern) terminus is in the city of El Paso, near the Mexican border and the eastern terminus is at Interstate 72 (I-72) in Griggsville.

Route description

|-
| (El Paso)
|
|-
|
|
|-
| (Panhandle)
|
|-
|
|
|-
|
|
|-
|
|
|-
|
|
|-
|Total
|
|}

Texas (El Paso) 

US 54 begins in El Paso at Loop 375 downtown. (US 54/Patriot Freeway) The highway serves as a major freeway for the Metro area's network, running north–south along the city's eastern slope of the Franklin Mountains range. The highway runs through the city for approximately  before reaching the New Mexico state line. Within the network, it is a military connector for Fort Bliss and Holloman Air Force Base.

New Mexico 

US 54 enters New Mexico in Chaparral as part of the El Paso, Texas Metro area network. It also serves as a military highway to connect Fort Bliss in El Paso to Holloman Air Force Base in Alamogordo, New Mexico (via U.S. Route 70). Upon entering Alamogordo, US 54 becomes concurrent with U.S. Route 70. US 54/US 70 then intersects the beginning of U.S. Route 82 at the north end of Alamogordo (near La Luz). The limit is 60 mph from Alamogordo to Tularosa and 55 mph north of Tularosa, where the concurrency with US 70 ends, and the highway reverts to being two lanes wide and not divided. The highway runs north through the central portion of the state, passing through Carrizozo and intersecting U.S. Route 380. The route then turns northeast before passing through Vaughn. Upon entering Vaughn, the route is briefly concurrent with U.S. Route 60 and U.S. Route 285. In Vaughn, US 285 splits off to the south. Exiting Vaughn, US 60 splits off to the southeast, and the route continues northeast to Santa Rosa where it becomes concurrent with Interstate 40. The highway then exits the state back into Texas at Nara Visa.

Texas (Panhandle) 

Major Texas cities along US 54 in the panhandle are Dalhart and Stratford.

Oklahoma 
US-54 runs through the Oklahoma Panhandle from southwest to northeast.  It enters at Texhoma,  then continues northeast through Goodwell before entering Guymon.  In Guymon, it intersects US-412 and begins a concurrency with US-64.  It goes northeast through Optima and Hooker, where US-64 turns east.  After going northeast through Tyrone, it enters Kansas just before entering Liberal, Kansas.

Kansas 

US 54 enters the state from Oklahoma in Seward County, and travels through the cities of Liberal and Plains, where it runs concurrently with US 160 in Meade County. Just east of the city of Meade, US 54 splits from US 160 and continues in a northeasterly direction through Meade and Ford counties before beginning a long concurrency with US 400 in Mullinville in Kiowa County.

The highway then travels through the town of Greensburg and continues as a two-lane road through Pratt, Cunningham, and Kingman. The road becomes a divided highway in eastern Kingman County. From Kingman to Garden Plain in Sedgwick County it is a freeway but becomes an at-grade expressway as it passes through Goddard and approaches Wichita.

The freeway resumes as the road crosses the city limits of Wichita near Wichita Dwight D. Eisenhower National Airport. In Wichita, US 54/US 400 is known as Kellogg Avenue, and has junctions with I-235, I-135 and I-35, the Kansas Turnpike, before a junction with K-96. The Kellogg Avenue freeway has six lanes and extends  from 111th Street on the west side of Wichita to Zelta just after the I-35/Kansas Turnpike interchange on the east side. Upgrading of Kellogg Avenue from a surface arterial to a freeway has been underway since the mid-1980s, with the latest interchange project opening in late 2019. The road gets its name from Milo Bailey Kellogg, a shopkeeper and Civil War veteran who was the city's first civilian postmaster in 1870.

The concurrency of US 54 and US 400 continues through Augusta in Butler County before US 400 heads east toward the Missouri state line, while US 54 forms a brief concurrency with US 77 through El Dorado. At El Dorado, US 54 continues its easterly course through rural areas in Greenwood and Woodson counties before passing through the cities of Iola and Fort Scott; US 77 heads north to Junction City. US 54 exits Kansas in Bourbon County before reaching Nevada, Missouri.

Missouri 

In Missouri, US 54 runs from the southwest portion of the state to the northeast. It is a major conduit through the Ozarks and is the primary access road to Pomme de Terre Lake and Lake of the Ozarks. After entering the state it passes through Nevada, El Dorado Springs, Hermitage, crossing Lake of the Ozarks the first time just north of Ha Ha Tonka State Park. It passes through Camdenton and crosses the lake a second time on the Grand Glaize Bridge at Osage Beach before bypassing Eldon and going through Jefferson City, where it crosses the Missouri River via the Jefferson City Bridge and briefly overlaps U.S. Route 63. Just north of the bridge, it splits passing through Fulton, crossing Interstate 70 at Kingdom City, bypassing Mexico, sharing a concurrency with Highway 19 through Laddonia, passing just north of Vandalia, and ultimately crossing the Mississippi River via the Champ Clark Bridge into Illinois at Louisiana.

Illinois 

In the state of Illinois, U.S. 54 runs from the Champ Clark Bridge over the Mississippi River to its terminus at Interstate 72 northeast near Griggsville. Before the eastern terminus was cut back to I-72, U.S. 54 continued northeast via several existing roads, including the current Illinois Route 54, Illinois Route 50, and Governors' Highway, into downtown Chicago, where it ended at Michigan Avenue and Lake Shore Drive. It is a rural, two-lane surface street for its entire length in Illinois.

History

Illinois
Initially, US 54 ended at the junction of present-day IL 106 (former portion of US 36). In 1935, it replaced a portion of IL 107 between Louisiana, Missouri and New Hartford, Illinois. From 1942 to 1971, US 54 reached downtown Chicago. It then got truncated back to its previous northern terminus. This was in favor of portions of US 36, Illinois Route 54, US 45, Illinois Route 50, Governors Highway, Wood Street, 127th Street, Halsted Street, Vincennes Avenue, State Street, and Michigan Avenue. The four-lane section of U.S. 36 northeast of Pittsfield now also carries Interstate 72 east to Springfield. As of 1992, US 54 was extended northeast to US 36 and present-day I-72 (exit 35). That same year, the section of road that once carried Illinois Route 54 through Springfield is no longer designated as a numbered highway. Now Illinois Route 54 starts at the Interstate 55 exit and goes northeast to Onarga, where it ends at U.S. Route 45. US 54 once joined with US 45 to Kankakee, but that highway is now designated as US 45 alone to Gilman, then US 45 and US 24 through Gilman, then US 45 alone again until a four-way intersection with U.S. Route 52 and Illinois Route 49, and US 45 and US 52 through Kankakee. Between Kankakee and Monee, the section that once carried US 54 is now marked as Illinois Route 50.

Major intersections 
Texas
  in El Paso
  in El Paso
  in El Paso
  in El Paso

New Mexico
  in Alamogordo. The highways travel concurrently to Tularosa.
  in Alamogordo
  in Carrizozo
  southwest of Vaughn. The highways travel concurrently to southeast of Vaughn.
  in Santa Rosa. The highways travel concurrently through the city.
  in Santa Rosa. I-40/US 54 travels concurrently to Tucumcari.
  in Santa Rosa
Texas
  in Dalhart
  in Stratford

Oklahoma
  in Guymon. The highways travel concurrently through the city.
  in Guymon. The highways travel concurrently to Hooker.

Kansas
  in Liberal
  east of Plains. The highways travel concurrently to east of Meade.
  in Minneola
  east of Mullinville. The highways travel concurrently to Pickrell Corner.
  west of Greensburg
  in Pratt
  in Wichita
  in Wichita
  in Wichita
  in Augusta. The highways travel concurrently to El Dorado.
  in Yates Center
  east of Iola
  in Moran
  north of Fort Scott. The highways travel concurrently to Fort Scott.

Missouri
  in Nevada
  in Preston
  in Jefferson City. US 54/US 63 travels concurrently through the city.
  in Kingdom City
  north of Bowling Green

Illinois
  in Griggsville Township

Related route

 U.S. Highway 154

See also

References

External links

 Endpoints of U.S. Highway 54
 Kansas Highway Maps: Current, Historic, KDOT

 
United States Numbered Highway System
U.S. Highways in Kansas
U.S. Highways in Illinois
U.S. Highways in Oklahoma
U.S. Highways in New Mexico